Vladimir Andreyevich Grebenshchikov (born August 14, 1992) is a Kazakhstani professional ice hockey defenceman who is currently playing with Arlan Kokshetau in the Kazakhstan Hockey Championship (KAZ). He has formerly played with Barys Astana in the Kontinental Hockey League (KHL).

Career statistics

Regular season

International

Awards 
Named KHL Rookie of the Week on November 5, 2013.

References

External links 

1992 births
Living people
Arlan Kokshetau players
Barys Nur-Sultan players
Kazakhstani ice hockey defencemen
Nomad Astana players
People from Temirtau
Snezhnye Barsy players
Universiade medalists in ice hockey
Universiade silver medalists for Kazakhstan
Competitors at the 2015 Winter Universiade